Domenic Marafiote (born 7 April 1981) is an Australian former professional tennis player.

A left-handed player from Adelaide, Marafiote had a best singles ranking of 328 in the world and won three titles at ITF Futures level. He featured in the qualifying draw for the Australian Open on four occasions and as a doubles player made a main draw appearance in 2005 partnering Robert Smeets, for a first round loss to Albert Costa/Rafael Nadal.

ITF Futures titles

Singles: (3)

Doubles: (8)

References

External links
 
 

1981 births
Living people
Australian male tennis players
Tennis players from Adelaide
21st-century Australian people